Edgewater Park can refer to a location in the United States:

 The Edgewater Park Site, an archaeology site in Iowa
 Edgewater Park, New Jersey, a township
 Edgewater Park (Bronx), New York, a neighborhood
 Edgewater Park (Cleveland), a portion of the Cleveland Metroparks Lakefront Reservation in Ohio
 Edgewater Park, Oklahoma, a census-designated place

See also 
 Edgewater (disambiguation)